Scott's sportive lemur (Lepilemur scottorum), or the Masoala sportive lemur, is a sportive lemur endemic to Madagascar.  This is one of 26 species in the genus Lepilemur. It has greyish brown fur and a black-tipped tail.  It is named in honor of the Suzanne and Walter Scott Jr. Foundation.

References

Sportive lemurs
Mammals described in 2008